John Alfred Main (22 June 1876 – 16 December 1945) was an Australian rules footballer who played with South Melbourne in the Victorian Football League (VFL) and Sturt in the South Australian Football League (SAFL).

References

External links 		
 
 

1876 births
1945 deaths
Sydney Swans players
Sturt Football Club players
Australian rules footballers from Victoria (Australia)